In real estate, an erf (pl. erven) is the legal term used in Namibia, South Africa and Eswatini to describe a piece of land registered in a deeds registry as an erf, lot, plot or stand. The term is of Afrikaans origin.

Section 102 of the South African Deeds Registries Act, 1937  provides the following definition: 

Section 1 of the Namibian Deeds Registries Act, 2015 (Act No. 14 of 2015) gives an identical definition.

See also 
 South African property law
 Township (South Africa)

References 

Real property law
Law of Namibia
Law of South Africa